Tunisian MiniFootball Federation is the governing body of minifootball in Tunisia. It was established in 2016. It became a member of the WMF in 2016, and joined AMF association the same year. It organises Tunisia Super League Elite, controls Tunisia national minifootball team and Tunisia women's national minifootball team.

Clubs
Clubs that have participated in the Tunisia Super League Elite 2021: 

Club Kurubis Mini–Foot
Association Sportive Mtorrech
Avenir Sportif Bouarada
Raoued Mini–Foot 
Association Sportive de Tronja
Capital Union
Football Club Mornag 
Association Municipale de la Marsa Mini–Foot
Association Sportive Pont de Bizerte
Stade Sportif Dar Chaâbane Fehri 
Union Sportive de Béni–Khiar
Somaâ Mini–Foot
Union Sportive de Hammamet 
Football Club de Nabeul
Riadh Sportif de Sousse 
Red Star de Sousse
Football Club de Messaâdine
Étoile Sportive de Bouarada
Union Sportive du Sahel
Association Sportive Aouabed 
Sporting Nahal 
Union Sportive Galaoui
Agerab Sport
Association Sportive de Tataouine

See also 
 Tunisia national minifootball team
 Tunisia national under-23 minifootball team
 Tunisia women's national minifootball team

Reference

External links
  Federation Tunisienne de MiniFootball

National members of the African Minifootball Federation
MiniFootball in Tunisia
Sports governing bodies in Tunisia
Sports organizations established in 2016